Uhroidy is an urban-type settlement in Sumy Raion of Sumy Oblast in Ukraine. It is located on the banks of the Rybytsia, a tributary of the Psel in the drainage basin of the Dnieper. Uhroidy belongs to Krasnopillia settlement hromada, one of the hromadas of Ukraine. Population: 

Until 18 July 2020, Uhroidy belonged to Krasnopillia Raion. The raion was abolished in July 2020 as part of the administrative reform of Ukraine, which reduced the number of raions of Sumy Oblast to five. The area of Krasnopillia Raion was merged into Sumy Raion.

Economy

Transportation
The settlement has road access to Krasnopillia which is further connected with Sumy and with Kharkiv via Bohodukhiv.

It is located on the railway which connects Sumy and Belgorod in Russia crossing the Russian border in Pushkarne. There is infrequent local traffic between Sumy and Pushkarne. There is no passenger traffic across the border.

References

Urban-type settlements in Sumy Raion